Dankou is a rural town in Chengbu Miao Autonomous County, Hunan, China. It is surrounded by Guanxia Town of Suining County on the north, Chang'anying Town on the west, Dingping Township on the south, and Rulin Town on the easth. Because there are many bamboos and trees in the town, it is hailed as "the home of bamboo and wood".

History
In 1995, four townships, namely Dankou, Yangshi, Liuzhai and Pinglin, merged to form the Dankou Town.

Administrative division
As of 2015, the town is divided into 1 community: Xiatuan Community, and 15 villages: Qianjin, Shuangshun, Qianzhou, Pingnanzhai, Taolin, Bianxi, Yongping, Xian'e, Qunwang, Yangshi, Shazhouyanmen, Qingtong, Xinshi, Dankou, Gonghe, Hualong, Jinyan, Taiping, Beixi, Shuanglong, Longzhai, Yangliu, Dongtoushan

Geography
The town is located in the southwest of Chengbu Miao Autonomous County.

The Wushui River flows through the town.

Climate

Demographics
On December 31, 2015, the National Bureau of Statistics of the People's Republic of China estimates the town's population was 25,800. Miao people is the dominant ethnic group in the town, accounting for 63.95% of the total population. There are also 12 ethnic groups, such as Dong, Yao, Hui and Manchu. Among them, there are 4,400 Han people (17.05%) and 3,300 Dong, Yao, Hui and Manchu people (12.79%).

Economy
Citrus, Myrica rubra, bamboo shoots, gastrodia elata and honeysuckle are famous local products in the town.

Tourist attractions
The former residence of Lan Yu is the birthplace of Lan Yu, a general in the early Ming dynasty (1368–1644). Now it is a historical site in Chengbu Miao Autonomous County.

The Baishuidong Waterfall a famous scenic spot.

References

Chengbu Miao Autonomous County